Kresnica is a dispersed settlement in the Slovene Hills west of Šentilj v Slovenskih Goricah in the Municipality of Šentilj in northeastern Slovenia.

References

External links
Kresnica on Geopedia

Populated places in the Municipality of Šentilj